Which Doobie U B? is the debut studio album by Los Angeles-based Latin hip hop group Funkdoobiest. It was released on May 4, 1993, via Epic Records. The album peaked at number 56 on the US Billboard 200 chart.

The album title comes from a line in an episode of the 1970s sitcom, What's Happening!!, when the main character, Raj, is introduced to special guests The Doobie Brothers.

Track listing

Personnel
Jason Vasquez – main artist
Ralph Medrano – main artist
Tyrone Pacheco – main artist
Louis Freese – featured artist (track 8)
Richard Todd Ray – producer (tracks: 4, 5, 7, 8)
Lawrence Muggerud – producer (tracks: 1, 2)
Leor Dimant – producer (tracks: 1, 2)
Jason Roberts – mixing (tracks: 1, 3, 6, 8, 12), recording (tracks: 1, 2, 6, 12)
Rich July – mixing (tracks: 5, 7)
Mike Calderon – mixing (tracks: 9, 10), recording (track 9)
Joe "The Butcher" Nicolo – mixing (track 2)
Chris Shaw – mixing & recording (track 4)
Mike Wallach – mixing & recording (track 11)
Anton Pukshansky – recording (tracks: 5, 7, 8)
Mike Green – recording (tracks: 3, 10)
Dante Ariola – art direction & design
Glenn Barr – illustration
Annalisa – photography
Pawn Shop Press – art direction & design
Buzztone Entertainment – management

Charts

References

External links

1993 debut albums
Funkdoobiest albums
Epic Records albums
Immortal Records albums
Albums produced by DJ Muggs
Albums produced by DJ Lethal